Andrew Ericson Lee (March 18, 1847 – March 19, 1934)  was an American politician who served as the third Governor of South Dakota.

Biography
Lee was born near Bergen in Norway and at a young age moved with his parents to the United States. His parents were Eric Lee and Augusta (Johnson) Lee.  He spent his childhood on a farm in Dane County, Wisconsin.  He moved to Dakota Territory and settled at Vermillion in 1867.  Lee and Charles E. Prentis became partners in a mercantile business in 1869.  Lee was married in 1872 to Annie M. Chappell. They had one daughter. Lee was the brother-in-law of Hans Gunderson and Lyman Burgess, both of whom served as members of  the Dakota Territory House of Representatives. He was the uncle of Carl Gunderson who served as  Governor of South Dakota. Hans Gunderson married Lee's sister Isabel. Isabel's brother and son were South Dakota Governors. (information about Isabel from unknown newspaper article in possession of a family member writing this update.)  It was also known in the family that Andrew Lee and Carl Gunderson did not get along.

Career
In 1896, Lee ran for Governor of South Dakota on the Populist ticket and beat A. O. Ringsrud of Elk Point by only 319 votes.  He was elected to his second term on the Fusion Party ticket, an alliance of Independents in the state. The party was formed in 1896 from an alliance of Democrats, Free Silver Republicans, and Populists who were opposed to the platform of the state Republican Party. He was the only non-Republican Governor to hold office until the election of William J. Bulow in 1926. Populist Governor Lee was instrumental in getting the Initiative and Referendum passed. A major focus during his administration was eliminating inefficiency and mismanagement within State Government. A major issue during his administration was the organization and return of the state militia which served in the Philippines during the Spanish–American War.

In 1900, the Populists nominated Lee for Congress, and he spoke at the Populist convention in Sioux Falls, South Dakota.  Lee lost in a Republican landslide, which ended the political influence of the Populists in South Dakota.  In 1908, Lee ran unsuccessfully as a Democratic candidate for Governor of South Dakota.

Death
Andrew Lee  died at his home in Vermillion, South Dakota, on March 19, 1934, the day after his 87th birthday.  The Gundersons and the Lees are buried in the old Bluff's Cemetery (Bluff View Cemetery in Vermillion, Clay County, South Dakota US).

References

External links
 
 
National Governors Association

1847 births
1934 deaths
Governors of South Dakota
People's Party state governors of the United States
Democratic Party governors of South Dakota
American people of Norwegian descent
People from Hordaland
South Dakota Populists
People from Vermillion, South Dakota